Prohibition is the seventeenth album by experimental French singer Brigitte Fontaine, released in 2009 on the Polydor label. The album features political content, as it is described by Fontaine as "a rebellious album", and the song Partir ou rester was written as a reaction to the 2007 French presidential election.

Track listing

Personnel
 Lyrics: Brigitte Fontaine
 Music: Areski Belkacem
 Producer: Ivor Guest
Seb Rochford - drums
Tom Herbert - bass guitar
Leo Abrahams, Leopold Ross - guitar
David Coulter - multiple instruments
Robert Logan - keyboards, cello

Charts

References 

Brigitte Fontaine albums
2009 albums